Kotavi is an asuri in Hindu mythology and the tutelary goddess of the race of daityas. She is also identified with the goddess Durga. In the Puranas, she is depicted as the mother of Banasura. In a desperate attempt to save her son's life in his battle against Krishna, she appears unclad in front of the latter, though the deity still slices his arms.

References

Sources 
A Classical Dictionary of Hindu Mythology & Religion by John Dowson

Characters in Hindu mythology
Tutelary deities
Asura

Characters in the Bhagavata Purana